The 2008 Sharpie 500 was the twenty-fourth race of the 2008 NASCAR Sprint Cup season and was raced on Saturday night, August 23 at Bristol Motor Speedway in Bristol, Tennessee. The event has been considered one of the toughest tickets in all of sports, tougher than the Super Bowl or the Opening Ceremonies of the Olympics, and is annually a sellout, of which this was the 53rd in a row for NSCS racing at the  track. ESPN telecast the race beginning at 7 pm US EDT and Performance Racing Network along with Sirius Satellite Radio had radio coverage starting at that same time.

Pre-race news
 Ken Schrader will drive the No. 96 Hall of Fame Racing Toyota this week in place of Brad Coleman.
 Four drivers in the second through fifth positions can clinch spots in the 2008 Chase for the Sprint Cup this week.  Carl Edwards, Jeff Burton, Jimmie Johnson and Dale Earnhardt Jr. can lock up positions by finishing this week's race.

Qualifying
Carl Edwards won the pole for the race.

OP: qualified via owners points

PC: qualified as past champion

PR: provisional

QR: via qualifying race

* - had to qualify on time

Failed to qualify: Jeff Green (#34), Johnny Sauter (#70), Patrick Carpentier (#10)

Race recap
Since the addition of the Car of Tomorrow and the repaving of the track, many fans thought that the old days of Bristol were over. These thoughts however were blown away in the closing laps of the race when Carl Edwards used the "Bump and Run" technique to get past Kyle Busch for the win, causing a post race confrontation where Busch rammed into the side of Edwards car during the cool down lap. Edwards responded by spinning Busch out as Busch turned to enter pit road. Busch used the same technique to take the lead from Carl Edwards on lap 55. Kyle Busch was called to the NASCAR Hauler after his post-race interview for the incident, and on August 27, both Edwards and Kyle Busch were put on probation for the next six Sprint Cup Races.  The race was also red-flagged at Lap 210 after an accident commonly called "The Big One" saw nine cars - including Chase contender Kasey Kahne - pile up in Turn 2.

There were only three lap leaders the entire race. Edwards and Busch led 499 laps combined, while Jeff Gordon led a lap.

Results

References

Sharpie 500
Sharpie 500
NASCAR races at Bristol Motor Speedway